Markus Antonio "Mark" Minichiello (born 30 January 1982) is a former Italy international rugby league footballer who played as a  forward.

He previously played for the Sydney Roosters, South Sydney Rabbitohs and the Gold Coast Titans in the NRL, and Hull F.C. in the Super League. He represented NSW City between 2007 and 2011.

Background
Minichiello was born in Sydney, New South Wales, Australia. He is the younger brother of former Golden Boot winner Anthony Minichiello.

Early career
While attending Westfields Sports High, Minichiello played for the Australian Schoolboys team in 1999.

Club career

Sydney Roosters
Minichiello  started his career with Sydney Roosters in 2002. He only played one game for the club before switching to the arch rivals South Sydney Rabbitohs.

South Sydney Rabbitohs
He played 85 games with the club during a tough time in their history as South Sydney finished last in 2003, 2004 and 2006.  He signed for Gold Coast Titans in 2007 which was the club's inaugural season.

Gold Coast Titans
He was an important member for the Gold Coast club since he joined in 2007.  In the 2009 NRL season, he was part of the Gold Coast side which qualified for the finals for the first time in their history.  The following year, he played in the club's preliminary final defeat against the Sydney Roosters at Suncorp Stadium.  

In 2011, he played 23 games as the Gold Coast finished last on the table and claimed the wooden spoon.  In total, he played 173 first grade games for the club between 2007-2014.

Hull FC
On 15 August 2014, Minichiello announced that he was joining Hull F.C. in the Super League on a two-year deal starting in 2015. Minichiello enjoyed a successful season with Hull F.C. in 2015, winning the Supporters' Player of the Year award & the club's Player of the Year award with Liam Watts.

On 27 January 2016, Minichiello extended his contract with Hull until the end of the 2017 season.

He played in the 2016 Challenge Cup Final victory over the Warrington Wolves at Wembley Stadium.

He played in the 2017 Challenge Cup Final victory over the Wigan Warriors at Wembley Stadium.

Representative career

City
He was selected for City in the City vs Country match on 8 May 2009.

Italy
Minichiello played for Italy at the 2013 and 2017 Rugby League World Cup.

Personal life
In 2017 Mark launched his own functional training and rehabilitation equipment company Xer360.

References

External links 

Hull FC profile
Mark Minichiello at the Gold Coast Titans official website.
SL profile
Xer360
2017 RLWC profile

1982 births
Living people
Australian people of Italian descent
Australian expatriate sportspeople in England
Australian rugby league players
Gold Coast Titans players
Hull F.C. players
Italy national rugby league team captains
Italy national rugby league team players
New South Wales City Origin rugby league team players
Rugby league players from Sydney
Rugby league second-rows
South Sydney Rabbitohs players
Sydney Roosters players
Tweed Heads Seagulls players